The 2022 Alabama Senate elections took place on November 8, 2022, as part of the 2022 United States elections. Alabama voters elected state senators in all 35 of the state's Senate districts. State senators serve four-year terms in the Alabama Senate in Montgomery.

A primary election on May 24, 2022, and a runoff election on June 22, 2022, determined which candidates appear on the November 8 general election ballot for the Alabama Republican Party and the Alabama Democratic Party. Libertarian candidates were nominated by party convention. This is the first time that the Libertarian Party of Alabama will be on the ballot since 2002. Primary election results can be obtained from the Alabama Secretary of State's website.

Following the 2018 election cycle, Republicans maintained effective control of the Senate with 27 members. Democrats hold 8 seats following the 2018 elections.

Republicans will retain control of the Alabama Senate after the 2022 elections with either as little as 15 seats (with the remainder split between Democrats and Libertarians) or as many as 29 seats.

Predictions

Results

Retiring incumbents

Democrats
District 19: Priscilla Dunn retired due to health issues.
District 23: Malika Sanders-Fortier retired to run for governor of Alabama.

Republicans
District 11: Jim McClendon retired.
District 12: Del Marsh retired
District 31: Jimmy Holley retired.

Incumbents defeated in primaries

Republicans
District 27: Tom Whatley lost renomination to Jay Hovey.

Chart of Senate members

Closest races 
Seats where the margin of victory was under 10%:

Detailed results

District 1 
2nd term incumbent Republican Senate Tim Melson has represented Alabama Senate 1st District since November 2014. He was challenged by construction manager John Sutherland in the Republican primary after Sutherland sued to stop a 2-cent gas tax extension from being pushed through by the Lauderdale County Agricutlural Authority, headed by Tim Melson, in order to build an event center just outside the city of Florence, Alabama. Melson defeated Sutherland by a margin of almost 40 points. No Democrats or Libertarians filed to run in the general election, leaving Melson unopposed in the general election.

Endorsements

District 2 
First term incumbent Republican Senator Tom Butler has represented the 2nd District since November 2018. He is running for reelection. Former State Senator Bill Holtzclaw challenged Butler in the primary for his old seat, citing a "lack of communication" in the district during the current term. Butler defeated Holtzclaw by a margin of 20 points in the primary. PROJECTXYZ founder and former Huntsville Chamber of Commerce Chair Kim Caudle Lewis is contesting the district in the general election.

Endorsements

District 3 
4th term incumbent Republican Senator Arthur Orr has represented Alabama Senate 2nd District since November 2006. He is running for reelection. Retired electrical engineer Rick Chandler was nominated by the Libertarian Party and is challenging Orr in the general election.

Endorsements

District 4 
First term incumbent Republican Senator Garlan Gudger ran unopposed.

Endorsements

District 5 
Third term incumbent and President pro tempore Greg Reed ran unopposed.

Endorsements

District 6 
Second term incumbent Republican Senator Larry Stutts has represented Alabama Senate 6th District since November 2014. United States Navy veteran Kyle Richard-Garrison was nominated by the Libertarian Party and is challenging Stutts in the general election.

Endorsements

District 7 
First term incumbent Republican Senator Sam Givhan has the 7th District since November 2018. Huntsville resident and University of Montevallo alumnus Korey Wilson is challenging Givhan in the general election.

Endorsements

District 8 
2nd term incumbent Republican Senator Steve Livingston ran unopposed.

Endorsements

District 9 
Third term incumbent Republican Senator Clay Scofield ran unopposed.

Endorsements

District 10 
First term incumbent Republican Senator Andrew Jones ran unopposed.

Endorsements

District 11 
Two-term Senator Jim McClendon announced that he would retire following the 2022 elections. Municipal court judge and city attorney Lance Bell  along with federal prison chaplain Michael Wright ran in the primary to replace McClendon. Bell stomped Wright in the primary. Since no Democrats or Libertarians filed to run for the seat, Bell ran unopposed in the general election.

Endorsements

District 12 
Fifth term Republican Senator Del Marsh has represented the 12th District since November 1998. He announced his retirement following the 2022 elections. Lawyer Wendy Ghee Draper, real estate firm owner Keith Kelley  and Weaver mayor Wayne Willis all ran in the primary to replace Marsh. During the campaign, a ballot challenge was filed against Wendy Ghee Draper due to her past donations to prominent Democrats. However, the Alabama Republican Party allowed her to remain on the ballot. In the primary, no candidate more than half of the total vote so Draper and Kelley advanced to a runoff. In the runoff, Kelley defeated Draper by a ten point margin. Certified public accountant Danny McCullars  was nominated by the Democratic Party and is contesting the district in the general election.

Endorsements

District 13 
First term incumbent Republican Senator Randy Price has represented the 13th District since November 2018. He is running for reelection. Retired firefighter and pastor John Coker challenged price in the primary election. Price defeated Coker in the primary. No Democrats or Libertarians filed to run for this seat, leaving Price unopposed in the general election.

Endorsements

District 14 
April Weaver is running unopposed for her first full term after being appointed to succeed Cam Ward in 2021.

Endorsements

District 15 
1st term incumbent Republican Senate Dan Roberts has represented Alabama Senate 15th District since November 2018. Urologist Brain Chistine challenged Roberts in the Republican primary. Roberts defeated Christine by a spread of twenty points. Michael Crump was nominated by the Libertarian Party and is contesting the district in the general election.

Endorsements

District 16 
Ninth term incumbent Republican Senator J. T. Waggoner ran unopposed in the 16th District, which he has represented since February 1990. Waggoner has been in and out of Alabama government continuously since 1966.

Endorsements

District 17 
Third term incumbent Republican Senateor Shay Shelnutt has represented the 17th District since November 2018. He is running for reelection. United States Marine Corps veteran Mike Dunn challenged Shelnutt in the primary after withdrawing from the 2022 United States Senate election in Alabama. Shelnutt defeated Dunn by a forty point margin in that election. John Fortenberry was nominated by the Libertarian Party and is contesting the district in the general election.

Endorsements

District 18 
8th term incumbent Democratic Senator Rodger Smitherman ran unopposed; he has represented the 18th District since February 1994.

Endorsements

District 19 
Fourth term Democratic Senator Priscilla Dunn represented Alabama Senate 19th District since 2009. She announced she would not run in the 2022 elections after her failing health caused her to miss most of the preceding legislative session. State Representatives Louise Alexander and Merika Coleman ran in the primary to replace Dunn. Coleman beat Alexander in the primary. Automotive technician Danny Wilson was nominated by the Libertarian Party and is contesting the district in the general election.

Endorsements

District 20 
5th term incumbent Democratic Senator Linda Coleman-Madison has represented Alabama Senate 20th District since February 2006. She was challenged by perennial candidate Rodney Huntley in the primary election. Coleman-Madison beat Huntley. No Republicans or Libertarians filed to run for this seat, leaving Coleman-Madison unopposed in the general election.

Endorsements

District 21 
Third term incumbent Republican Senator Gerald Allen has represented the 21st District since November 2010. He is running for reelection. Gary, Indiana native and Democratic activist Lisa Ward was nominated by the Democratic Party and is contesting the district in the general election.

Endorsements

District 22 
Second term incumbent Republican Senator Greg Albritton has represented the 22nd District since November 2018. He is running for reelection. Retired United States Army chaplain Stephen Sexton challenged Albritton in the primary, receiving one third of the vote.

Endorsements

District 23 
First term Democratic Senator Malika Sanders-Fortier retired to run in the 2022 Alabama gubernatorial election, eventually losing in a runoff to Yolanda Flowers. Former Selma mayor Darrio Melton, Former Democratic State Senator and Sanders-Fortier's father Hank Sanders, former candidate for Selma mayor Thayer Spencer and accountant Robert Stewart all ran in the primary to replace Sanders-Fortier. However, no candidate won more than half of the vote so Sanders and Stewart advanced to a runoff. In the runoff, Stewart defeated Sanders by about ten percentage points. Butler County School Board member Michael Nimmer was nominated by the Republican Party and political consultant Portia Shepherd was nominated by the Libertarian Party to run for the seat, respectively.

Endorsements

District 24 
5th term incumbent Democratic Senator and Minority Leader Bobby Singleton has represented the 24th District since 2005. Demopolis native Richard Benderson was nominated by the Libertarian Party and is challenging Singleton in the general election.

Endorsements

District 25 
1st term incumbent Republican Senator Will Barfoot has represented the 25th District since November 2018. Retired Alabama Department of Public Health statistician and Holt native Louie Albert Woolbright  was nominated by the Libertarian Party and is contesting the district in the general election.

Endorsements

District 26 
Kirk Hatcher is running for his first full term unopposed after succeeding David Burkette in 2021.

Endorsements

District 27 
Three term incumbent Republican Senator Tom Whatley was controversially defeated in the primary by Auburn city councilman Jay Hovey by a single vote. Shortly after, a New York Times editorial emerged telling a story of how a creative writing professor at Auburn University had convinced a substantial amount of avowed Democrats to vote in the Republican primary for Hovey due to Whatley's "abhorrent" record on legislation regarding abortion. After this article emerged, Whatley declared himself "the rightful winner" of the election and produced a testimony from a single voter still registered in Georgia that stated they would have voted for Whatley if they were able. However, Whatley soon conceded the election to Hovey before an official recount could be conducted at the Alabama Republican Party headquarters. This election will likely lead to the Alabama Legislature passing laws requiring closed primary elections in last legislative session of the 2022 calendar year. United States Army Human Resources Officer Sherri Reese was nominated by the Democratic Party and is challenging Hovey in the general election.

Endorsements

District 28 
Third term incumbent Democratic Senator Billy Beasley has represented the 20th District since November 2010. Tuskegee mayor pro tempore Frank "Chris" Lee challenged Beasley in the primary. Beasley narrowly defeated Lee in the primary election. Dothan native David Boatwright was nominated by the Libertarian Party and is contesting the district in the general election.

Endorsements

District 29 
First term Republican Senator Donnie Chesteen has represented the 29th District since November 2018. Former State Representative Nathan Mathis was nominated by the Democratic Party and Daleville native Floyd "Pete" McBroom was nominated by the Libertarian Party to run for the seat, respectively.

Endorsements

District 30 
Second term incumbent Republican Senate Clyde Chambliss has represented the 30th District since 2014. He is running unopposed.

Endorsements

District 31  
Sixth term incumbent Republican Senator Jimmy Holley has represented the 31st District since November 1998. He announced his retirement following the 2022 election cycle. Coffee County Commissioner Josh Carnley, aircraft mechanic "Stormin'" Norman Horton, and State Representative Mike Jones all ran in the primary to replace Holley. Carnley cleared the field without needing a runoff. No Democrats or Libertarians filed to run for the seat, leaving Carnley unopposed in the general election.

Endorsements

District 32 
First term incumbent Republican Senator Chris Elliott ran unopposed in the 32nd district.

Endorsements

District 33 
7th term incumbent Democratic Senator Vivian Figures has represented the 29th District since 1997. Retired United States Navy CO and commercial real estate broker Pete Riehm  was nominated by the Republican Party and is contesting the district in the general election.

Endorsements

District 34 
First term incumbent Republican Senator Jack Williams ran unopposed in the 34th district.

Endorsements

District 35 
First term incumbent Republican Senator David Sessions has represented the 35th district since 2018. The Libertarian Party nominated systems analyst Clifton Hudson, who is challenging Sessions in the general election.

Endorsements

See also
2022 United States Senate election in Alabama
2022 United States House of Representatives elections
2022 United States gubernatorial elections
2022 Alabama lieutenant gubernatorial election
2022 United States state legislative elections
2022 Alabama House of Representatives election
2022 Alabama elections

References

External links

Senate
Alabama Senate elections
Alabama Senate